The Skoda 105 mm Model 1939 (105 mm M.39) was a mountain gun, manufactured by Skoda Works as a companion piece for the 75 mm M.39. This was a revised version of the 100 mm M.16 and 100 mm M.16/19. Like them it was broken down into three loads, each towed by a pair of horses, for transport.

References
 Chamberlain, Peter and Gander, Terry. Infantry, Mountain and Airborne Guns

World War II field artillery
Artillery of Czechoslovakia
Mountain artillery
105 mm artillery
Military equipment introduced in the 1930s